Eromba is an ethnic dish of the Meitei community of Manipur, India.

History 
The word "eromba" comes from "eeru taana lonba", a Meitei term for a liquid that is mixed.

Preparation 
The vegetables (such as potatoes and garlic), spices (such as chilies) and herbs are boiled with or without ngari then smashed with hands, whisked with a whisker or blend with a blender.

See also
Cuisine of Manipur

References

Manipuri cuisine
Chutney